Handicap race may refer to:

 Handicap (horse racing), a race in which horses carry different weights
 Handicap (greyhound racing), a race in which greyhounds start from different starting traps
 Bracket racing, in drag racing, where cars, motorcycles, or trucks start at different times based on vehicle category.
 Handicap (sailing), handicaps for sailing vessels in races
 Handicap (speedway), the Match Average calculated for every motorcycle speedway rider

See also
 Handicapping, the various methods of leveling the outcome in a competitive sport or game